Kladognathus is an extinct genus of conodonts.

References 

  The Kladognathus Apparatus (Conodonta, Carboniferous): Homologies with Ozarkodinids, and the Prioniodinid Bauplan. Mark A. Purnell, Journal of Paleontology, Vol. 67, No. 5 (Sep., 1993), pages 875-882 (Stable URL)
 Kladognathus Rexroad, 1958, not Cladognathodus Rexroad and Collinson, 1961. Michael C. Mound, Micropaleontology, July 1965, volume 11, issue 3 (abstract)

External links 

 

Prioniodontida genera
Fossil taxa described in 1958